|-style="background:#E9E9E9;"
! colspan="2" style="text-align:left;" |Parties
!Votes
!%
!+/-
!Seats
!+/-
|-
| style="background-color: " |
| style="text-align:left;" | Christian Democratic Union
| 577,867	
| 46.4%
| -1.6%
| 69
| +4
|-
| width=5px style="background-color: " |
| style="text-align:left;" | Social Democratic Party of Germany
| 402,875
| 32.4%
| -5.9%
| 48
| -3
|-
| style="background-color: " |
| style="text-align:left;" | Alternative List
| 132,484
| 10.6%
| +3.4%
| 15
| +6
|-
| style="background-color: " |
| style="text-align:left;" | Free Democratic Party
| 105,209		
| 8.5%
| +2.9%
| 12
| +5
|-
| style="background-color: " |
| style="text-align:left;" | Democratic Alliance
| 15,857
| 1.3%
| +1.3%
| 0
| 
|-
| style="background-color: " |
| style="text-align:left;" | Socialist Unity Party of West Berlin
| 7,731
| 0.6%
| ±0.0%
| 0
| 
|-
| style="background-color: " |
| style="text-align:left;" | Other Parties
| 2,981
| 0.2%
| -0.2%
| 0
| 
|- style="background:#E9E9E9;"
! colspan="2" style="text-align:left;" |Total
! style="text-align:center;" | 1,259,818	
! style="text-align:center;" colspan="2"| 100%
! style="text-align:center;" | 144
! style="text-align:center;" | +12
|-
|colspan=7|Source
|}

State election, 1981
1985 elections in Germany